Maftuna Shoyimova (born 1 January 1999) is an Uzbekistani footballer who plays as a midfielder for Women's Championship club Sevinch and the Uzbekistan women's national team.

International goals

See also
List of Uzbekistan women's international footballers

References 

1999 births
Living people
Women's association football midfielders
Uzbekistani women's footballers
People from Qashqadaryo Region
Uzbekistan women's international footballers
Uzbekistani women's futsal players
21st-century Uzbekistani women